Robert Henry Gottlieb (January 20, 1940 – November 23, 2014) was an American basketball coach for the NCAA Division I University of Wisconsin–Milwaukee team from 1975–1980, and was also the head coach of Jacksonville University for two years prior. He was the father of basketball analyst and sports talk radio host Doug Gottlieb and Grand Canyon University assistant coach Gregg Gottlieb.

He compiled a 62–70 record (.470) in five seasons for UW–Milwaukee, a transitioning NCAA Division I Independent at the time. The program moved back to NCAA Division III competition for the 1980–81 season following his departure.

Bob Gottlieb had over 100 wins as a head coach at the Division I level, including wins over Gonzaga, Cincinnati, Florida State, Auburn, Illinois, Western Kentucky, Vanderbilt, and the University of Tulsa. He coached under Jack Hartman at Kansas State, Eddie Sutton at Creighton, Tex Winter at Long Beach State, as well as Ralph Miller at Oregon State.  In 2014, his son Gregg, joined the staff at Oregon State as an assistant under Wayne Tinkle.

For his last 10 years he operated a leading year-round basketball development program for offensive basketball skills in Southern California, Branch West Basketball Academy.

Gottlieb died on November 23, 2014 at the age of 74.

In 2018 he was inducted into the Southern California Jewish Sports Hall of Fame.

Head coaching record

References

External links
 Branch West

1940 births
2014 deaths
College men's basketball head coaches in the United States
Creighton Bluejays men's basketball coaches
Jacksonville Dolphins men's basketball coaches
Kansas State Wildcats men's basketball coaches
Long Beach State Beach men's basketball coaches
Milwaukee Panthers men's basketball coaches
Oregon State Beavers men's basketball coaches